The Bishop to the Archbishops of Canterbury and York is a position within the hierarchy of the Church of England. It is a non-diocesan appointment in which a bishop acts as head of staff or general assistant to the Archbishop of Canterbury and to the Archbishop of York. It was created in 2021 to replace the former role Bishop at Lambeth, who assisted only the Archbishops of Canterbury.

On 19 April 2021, it was announced that Emma Ineson, then Bishop suffragan of Penrith, was to move to Lambeth Palace, to become "Bishop to the Archbishops of Canterbury and York". She took up the appointment on 1 June 2021, and her new role replaces that of Bishop at Lambeth as episcopal assistant to Justin Welby, Archbishop of Canterbury. The new role also includes assisting Stephen Cottrell, Archbishop of York, coordinating between Lambeth and Bishopthorpe, and overseeing the Lambeth Conference 2022 programme. On 15 December 2022, it was announced that Ineson was to become the next Bishop of Kensington (an area bishop in the Diocese of London) in "spring 2023". On 2 February 2023, it was announced that David Urquhart (retired Bishop of Birmingham) would succeed Ineson for a one-year interim period starting during the week beginning 6 February 2023.

Past and present bishops

References

Church of England bishops
Non-diocesan Anglican bishops
Anglican episcopal offices